The term Black Madonna or Black Virgin tends to refer to statues or paintings in Western Christendom of the Blessed Virgin Mary and the Infant Jesus, where both figures are depicted with dark skin. The Black Madonna can be found both in Catholic and Orthodox countries.

The paintings are usually icons which are Byzantine in origin or style, some of which were produced in 13th- or 14th-century Italy. Other examples from the Middle East, Caucasus or Africa, mainly Egypt and Ethiopia, are even older. They fall into two main groups: free-standing upright figures or seated figures on a throne. There are about 400–500 Black Madonnas in Europe, depending on how they are classified. There are at least 180 Vierges Noires in Southern France alone, and there are hundreds of non-medieval copies as well. Some are in museums, but most are in churches or shrines and are venerated by believers. Some are associated with miracles and attract substantial numbers of pilgrims.

Black Madonnas come in different forms, and the speculations behind the reason for the dark hue of each individual icon or statue vary greatly and are not without controversy. Explanations range from  Madonnas simply made from dark wood, and Madonnas that have turned darker over time, due to factors like aging or candle smoke, to a study by Jungian scholar Ean Begg into the potential pagan origins of the cult of the black Madonna and child.
Another speculated cause for the dark-skinned depiction is due to pre-Christian deities being re-envisioned as the Madonna and child.

Studies and research
Research into the Black Madonna phenomenon is limited. Begg links the refrain from the Song of Solomon, ‘I am black, but I am beautiful’ to the Queen of Sheba. Recently, however, interest in this subject has gathered more momentum.

Important early studies of dark-skinned holy images in France were by Camille Flammarion (1888), Marie Durand-Lefebvre (1937), Emile Saillens (1945), and Jacques Huynen (1972). The first notable study of the origin and meaning of the Black Madonnas in English appears to have been presented by Leonard Moss at a meeting of the American Association for the Advancement of Science on December 28, 1952. Moss broke the images into three categories: (1) dark brown or black Madonnas with physiognomy and skin pigmentation matching that of the indigenous population; (2) various art forms that have turned black as a result of certain physical factors such as deterioration of lead-based pigments, accumulated smoke from the use of votive candles, and accumulation of grime over the ages, and (3) residual category with no ready explanation.

Some scholars chose to investigate the significance of the dark-skinned complexion to pilgrims and worshipers rather than focusing on whether this depiction was intentional. By virtue of their presence, many Black Madonnas turn the shrines in which they are housed into revered pilgrimage sites. Monique Scheer attributes the importance of the dark-skinned depiction to its connection with authenticity. The reason for this connection is the perceived age of the figures.

List of Black Madonnas

Africa
 Algeria, Algiers: "Our Lady of Africa" 
 Côte d’Ivoire, Yamoussoukro: Madonna and child inside Basilica of Our Lady of Peace.
 Senegal, Popenguine: "Notre-Dame de la Délivrance"
 South Africa, Soweto: "The Black Madonna"

Asia

Japan

Tsuruoka city, Yamagata prefecture: Tsuruoka Tenshudô Catholic Church features a black Madonna statue given by France during Meiji period

The Philippines

 Antipolo, Rizal:  (Our Lady of Peace and Good Voyage of Antipolo) 
 Ermita, City of Manila:  (Our Lady of Guidance)
 Santa Ana, City of Manila:  (Our Lady of the Abandoned)
 Parañaque:  (Our Lady of the Good Event)
 Lapu-Lapu City:  (Our Lady of the Rule)
 Naga, Camarines Sur:  (Our Lady of Peñafrancia)
 Piat, Cagayan:  (Our Lady of Piat)
 Joroan, Tiwi, Albay:  (Our Lady of Salvation)

India
 Dhori Mata
 Korvi Mata, Dediapada, Gujarat

Turkey
 Trabzon: Sümela Monastery

Europe

Austria
 Lavanttal, Carinthia, Austria: St. Andrä im Lavanttal  Basilica Maria Loreto

Belgium
 Brugge, "Our Lady of Regla"
 Brussels: "De Zwerte Lieve Vrouwo", St. Catherine Church
 Halle (Flemish Brabant) : Sint-Martinusbasiliek
 Liège: La Vierge Noire d'Outremeuse,
 Lier: Onze lieve vrouw ter Gratien
 Scherpenheuvel-Zichem: Our Lady of Scherpenheuvel
 Tournai: Our Lady of Flanders in Tournai Cathedral
 Verviers: "Black Virgin of the Recollects", Notre-Dame des Récollets Church, 
 Walcourt: (Notre-Dames de Walcourt)

Croatia
 Marija Bistrica: Our Lady of Bistrica, Queen of Croatia

Czech Republic
 Brno: Assumption of Virgin Mary Minor Basilica, St Thomas's Abbey, Brno
 Prague: The Madonna of Breznice; The Black Madonna in The Church of Our Lady Under the Chain (Kostel Panny Marie pod řetězem) The Black Madonna on the House of the Black Madonna.

France

 Aix-en-Provence, (Bouches-du-Rhône): Notre-Dame des Graces, Cathédrale Saint-Sauveur d'Aix
 Arconsat: (Notre-Dame des Champs)
 Aurillac, (Cantal): Notre-Dame des Neiges
 Beaune: Our Lady of Beaune
 Besançon: Our Lady de Gray
 Besse-et-Saint-Anastaise, (Puy-de-Dôme): Saint-André Church, Notre-Dame de Vassivière
 Bourg-en-Bresse, (Ain): 13th century
 Chartres, (Eure-et-Loir): crypt of the Cathedral of Chartres, Notre-Dame-de-Sous-Terre
 Clermont-Ferrand, (Puy-de-Dôme)
 Cusset: the Black Virgin of Cusset
 Dijon, (Côte-d'Or): Church of Notre-Dame of Dijon
 Douvres-la-Délivrande, Basilique Notre-Dame de la Délivrande, "Notre-Dame de la Délivrande"
 Dunkerque, (Nord) : Chapelle des Dunes
 Guingamp, (Côtes-d'Armor): Basilica of Notre Dame de Bon Secours.
 La Chapelle-Geneste, (Haute-Loire: Notre Dame de La Chapelle Geneste
 Laon, (Aisne): Notre-Dame Cathedral, statue of 1848
 Le Havre,(Seine-Maritime): statue near the Graville Abbey (Abbaye de Graville)
 Le Puy-en-Velay: In 1254 when passing through on his return from the Holy Land Saint Louis IX of France gave the cathedral an ebony image of the Blessed Virgin clothed in gold brocade (Notre-Dame du Puy). It was destroyed during the Revolution, but replaced at the Restoration with a copy that continues to be venerated.
 Liesse-Notre-Dame, (Aisne): Notre-Dame de Liesse, statue destroyed in 1793, copy of 1857
 Marseille, (Bouches-du-Rhône): Notre-Dame-de-Confession, Abbey of St. Victor; Notre-Dame d'Huveaune, Saint-Giniez Church
 Mauriac, Cantal: Notre Dame des Miracles
 Mende, (Lozère) : Cathedral (Basilique-cathédrale Notre-Dame-et-Saint-Privat de Mende)
 Menton, (Alpes-Maritimes): St. Michel Church
 Meymac, (Corrèze): Meymac Abbey
 Molompize: Notre-Dame de Vauclair
 Mont-Saint-Michel: Notre-Dame du Mont-Tombe
 Myans, (Savoie): Sanctuaire Notre-Dame de Myans
 Paris, (Neuilly-sur-Seine): Notre-Dame de Bonne Délivrance, in the motherhouse of the Sisters of St. Thomas of Villanova 
 Quimper, (Finistère): Eglise de Guéodet, nommée encore Notre-Dame-de-la-Cité
 Riom, (Puy-de-Dôme): Notre-Dame du Marthuret
 Rocamadour, (Lot): Our Lady of Rocamadour
 Sainte Marie (Réunion) : 
 Saintes-Maries-de-la-Mer (Camarque) Avignon: Annual Roma pilgrimage and festival celebrating Sara, the patron saint of the Roma
 Soissons (Aisne): statue of the 12th century
 Tarascon, (Bouches-du-Rhône): Notre-Dame du Château
 Thuret, (Puy-de-Dôme)
 Toulouse: The basilica Notre-Dame de la Daurade in Toulouse, France had housed the shrine of a Black Madonna. The original icon was stolen in the fifteenth century, and its first replacement was burned by Revolutionaries in 1799 on the Place du Capitole. The icon presented today is an 1807 copy of the fifteenth century Madonna. Blackened by the hosts of candles, the second Madonna was known from the sixteenth century as Our Lady La Noire 
 Tournemire, Château d'Anjony, Our Lady of Anjony
 Vaison-la-Romaine, (Vaucluse): statue on a hill
 Vichy, (Allier): Saint-Blaise Church

Germany

 Altötting (Bavaria): Gnadenkapelle (Chapel of the Miraculous Image)
 Beilstein (Rhineland-Palatinate): Karmeliterkirche St. Joseph
 Bielefeld (North Rhine-Westphalia)
 Düsseldorf-Benrath (North Rhine-Westphalia): Pfarrkirche St. Cäcilia
 Hirschberg an der Bergstraße (Baden-Württemberg): Wallfahrtskirche St. Johannes Baptist
 Schloss Hohenstein, Upper Franconia (Bavaria)
 Köln (Nord Rhein Westfalen): St. Maria in der Kupfergasse
 Ludwigshafen-Oggersheim (Rhineland-Palatinate): Schloss- und Wallfahrtskirche Mariä Himmelfahrt (Ludwigshafen)
 Mainau (Baden-Württemberg): Schlosskirche St. Marien
 Munich (Bavaria): Theatine Church; St. Boniface's Abbey
 Rastatt (Baden-Württemberg): Einsiedelner Kapelle
 Regensburg (Bavaria): Regensburg Cathedral
 Remagen (Rhineland-Palatinate): Kapelle Schwarze Madonna
 Spabrücken (Rhineland-Palatinate)
 Stetten ob Lontal, Niederstotzingen (Baden-Württemberg)
 Windhausen in Boppard-Herschwiesen (Rhineland-Palatinate)
 Wipperfürth (North Rhine-Westphalia): St. Johannes, Kreuzberg
 Wuppertal-Beyenburg (North Rhine-Westphalia)

Greece
 Hidden church of the Black Madonna, Vamos, Crete

Hungary

 Cathedral Basilica of Eger: Our Lady of the Immaculate Conception

Ireland
 Dublin (Leinster): Our Lady of Dublin in Whitefriar Street Carmelite Church

Italy

 Biella (Piedmont): Black Virgin of Oropa, sanctuary of Oropa
 Canneto Valley near Settefrati (Lazio): Madonna di Canneto
 Casale Monferrato (Piedmont): Our Lady of Crea. In the hillside Sanctuary at Crea (Santuario di Crea), a cedar-wood figure, said to be one of three Black Virgins brought to Italy from the Holy Land c. 345 by St. Eusebius.
 Castelmonte, Prepotto (Friuli-Venezia Giulia)
 Gubbio, Italy: The Niger-Regin square, discovered carved in the cave of Sibilla Eugubina on Mount Ingino, is considered to be a word square form the "Black Queen". Seemingly of Neo-Templar origin, it is dated between 1600–1800 CE, was discovered in 2003, and destroyed by vandalism in 2012.

 Loreto (Marche): Basilica della Santa Casa
 Naples (Campania): Santuario-Basilica SS Carmine Maggiore
 Pescasseroli (Abruzzo): Madonna di Monte Tranquillo 
 Positano (Campania): Located in the church of Santa Maria Assunta, the story of how it got there—sailors shouting "Posa, posa!" ("Put it down, put it down!")—gave the town its name.
 San Severo (Apulia): "La Madonna del Soccorso" (The Madonna of Succor), St. Severinus Abbot and Saint Severus Bishop Faeto. Statue in gold garments, object of a major three-day festival that attracts over 350,000 people to this small town.
 Seminara (Calabria): Maria Santissima dei poveri
 Tindari (Sicily): Our Lady of Tindari
 Torre Annunziata (Campania): Madonna della Neve
 Venice (Veneto): Madonna della Salute, Santa Maria della Salute
 Viggiano (Basilicata): Santuario Madonna del Sacro Monte

Kosovo
 Vitina-: Church of the Black Madonna, where Mother Teresa is believed to have heard her calling.

Lithuania

 Aušros vartai: Our Lady of the Gate of Dawn
 Our Lady of Šiluva: Our Lady of the Pine Woods

Luxembourg
 Esch-sur-Sûre
 Luxembourg: Luxembourg-Grund
 Luxembourg: St. John's Church

Macedonia
 Kališta, Monastery: Madonna icon in the Nativity of Our Most Holy Mother of God church
 Ohrid, Church: Madonna with the child

Malta
 Ħamrun: Our Lady of Atoċja, a medieval painting brought to Malta by a merchant in the year 1630, depicting a statue found in Atocha, a parish in Madrid, Spain, and widely known as Il-Madonna tas-Samra. (This can mean 'tanned Madonna', 'brown Madonna', or 'Madonna of Samaria'.)

Poland

 Częstochowa: Our Lady of Czestochowa
 In the United States, the National Shrine of Our Lady of Czestochowa, in Doylestown, Pennsylvania houses a reproduction of the Black Madonna of Częstochowa. A second shrine to Our Lady of Częstochowa is located near Eureka, Missouri.
 In Israel there are two reproductions of the Black Madonna of Częstochowa: One in St. Peter's Church in Tel Aviv, and another in the Abbey of the Dormition in Jerusalem.
 Głogówek: Our Lady of Loretto

Portugal
 Nazaré (Oeste Subregion): Sanctuary of Our Lady of Nazaré; see: the legend of Nazaré

Romania
 : Maica Domnului Siriaca – 
 Cacica: Madona Neagra – Biserica Cacica
 Bucuresti: Madona Neagra – Biserica Dichiu

Russia
 Kostroma (Kostroma Oblast): Theotokos of St. Theodore also known as Our Lady of St. Theodore (Федоровская Богоматерь), in Theophany Monastery
 Our Lady of Wladimir, from the 12th century
 Black Virgin of Taganrog, Taganrog Old Cemetery

Serbia 
 Apatin (Vojvodina): Blessed Virgin Mary Catholic Church

Slovenia
 Koprivna, Črna na Koroškem: St. Anne's Church, Koprivna – the altar of Black Madonna

Spain

 Coria (Province of Cáceres):  (Our Lady of Argeme)
 El Puerto de Santa María (Province of Cádiz):  (The Virgin of the Miracles)
 Guadalupe (Province of Cáceres):  (Our Lady of Guadalupe, Extremadura)
 Jerez de la Frontera (Province of Cádiz):  (Our Lady Of Mercy)
 Madrid (Community of Madrid):  (Our Lady of Atocha)
 Lluc, Majorca (Balearic Islands):  (Our Lady of Lluc), Lluc Monastery
 Monistrol de Montserrat (Catalonia):  (Virgin of Montserrat) or "" in the Benedictine abbey of Santa Maria de Montserrat
 Ponferrada (Province of León):  (Our Lady of the Holm Oak)
 Salamanca (Province of Salamanca):  (The Virgin of France's Rock, named after the local mountain called )
 Santiago de Compostela (Galicia): A replica of ""
 Tenerife (Canary Islands):  (Virgin of Candelaria), or ""
 Torreciudad (Huesca): Our Lady of Torreciudad

Sweden
 Lunds Domkyrka Lund Cathedral Attached to a marble pillar in the crypt: Black madonna with child 
 Skee Kyrka Bohuslän former Norwegian and Danish province. Black madonna with beheaded child

Switzerland
 Einsiedeln (Canton of Schwyz): Our Lady of the Hermits
 In the United States, a reproduction of Our Lady of the Hermits was gifted to the St. Meinrad Archabbey located in St. Meinrad, Indiana
 Sonogno, Valle Verzasca (Canton of Ticino): Santa Maria Loretana
 Uetikon upon Lake (Canton of Zürich): Catholic Church Saint Francis of Assisi
 Metzerlen-Mariastein (Canton of Solothurn): Mariastein Abbey
 Ascona (Canton of Ticino): Black Chapel
 Lugano (Canton of Ticino): Chiesa di Santa Maria di Loreto

Ukraine
 Tsarytsya Karpat (Hoshiv Monastery): The Queen of the Carpathian Land

United Kingdom
 St. Mary Willesden (Our Lady of Willesden): The original Shrine of Our Lady of Willesden.
 Our Lady of Częstochowa (Church of Our Lady of Czestochowa, Nottingham)

North America

Costa Rica
 Cartago, Cartago Province: Basílica de Nuestra Señora de los Ángeles (Our Lady of the Angels Basilica)

Cuba
 Regla, Havana Province: Nuestra Señora de Regla (Spanish for Our Lady of Regla)

Mexico
 Tepeyac, Mexico City: Our Lady of Guadalupe

Trinidad and Tobago
 Siparia: La Divina Pastora
 Gran Couva: Our Lady of Montserrat

United States

 Black Madonna Shrine, Missouri
 Our Lady of Ferguson

Detroit Michigan Shrine of the Black Madonna Church

Canada 

Windsor , Ontario -Black Madonna chapel located at Italian banquet hall Ciociaro club .

South America

Brazil

 Aparecida, São Paulo: Our Lady of Aparecida or Our Lady Appeared (Nossa Senhora Aparecida or Nossa Senhora da Conceição Aparecida) in the Basilica of the National Shrine of Our Lady of Aparecida

Chile
 Andacollo, Elqui Province: La Virgen Morena (Spanish for The Brunette Virgin)

See also
 Black Nazarene
 Mariology
 Sofia, Bulgaria

References

Sources
 Channell, J., "Black Virgin Sites in France"
 Rozett, Ella. "Index of Black Madonnas Worldwide", InterfaithMary.net

External links

 List of Black Madonnas
 The Black Virgin – Karen Ralls
 Montserrat
 Pilgrimage
 Black Madonna gallery by Canon Jim Irvine, New Brunswick, Canada
 The Black Madonna "The work of God"
 Nuestra Señora de Atocha
 Black Madonna Pilgrimage to Central France
 Black Madonna photo collection on Flickr
 Black Madonnas and other Mysteries of Mary – Ella Rozett
 Sciorra, Joseph. "The Black Madonna of Thirteenth Street", Voices: The Journal of New York Folklore, Vol. 30, Spring-Summer 2004
 Black Madonna in modern art - see Black Madonna by BystreetSky Artist https://web.archive.org/web/20180802193137/https://www.bystreetsky.com/bystreetsky-art?lightbox=dataItem-j74w6ola

Virgin Mary in art
Catholic paintings
Catholic sculpture